Danny Bakker may refer to:

 Danny Bakker (footballer, born 16 January 1995), Dutch footballer
 Danny Bakker (footballer, born 25 January 1995), Dutch footballer